is an annual event featuring live performances from female solo idols and idol groups from all over Japan. The festival has been held since 2010.

In 2014, The Wall Street Journal blog estimated that TIF is one of 5 places in Japan to enjoy summer music festivals.

More than 200 idol groups, and about 1500 idols performed and attracted more than 80,000 spectators in 2017.

References

External links 
 

Music festivals in Japan
Annual events in Japan
Events in Tokyo
2010 establishments in Japan
Music festivals established in 2010
Japanese idol events